The International Association of Plastics Distributors (or IAPD), founded in 1956, is a trade association representing plastics distributors and manufacturers of engineering materials and semi-finished stock shapes, such as sheet, rod, tube, film, resin, pipe, valves and fittings.

Overview
These materials are used in construction, marine, automotive, medical and other industrial applications. The association consists of about 400 member companies, with almost 2,000 locations throughout the world.

External links
International Association of Plastics Distributors
Spray Bottle Definition, Manufacturing & Applications

Plastics industry organizations
Plastics